Karen Koslowitz was the Council member for the 29th district of the New York City Council. She is a Democrat.

The district includes Forest Hills, Forest Park, Kew Gardens, Rego Park, and Richmond Hill.

Life and career
Koslowitz's parents immigrated to the United States from Krakow, Poland, settling in the Soundview section of The Bronx. She was raised in the Bronx, where she attended James Monroe High School. She has two daughters, Heidi and Marcia.

Koslowitz began her career in the private sector, at Fischbach and Moore, Inc., electrical contractors. She entered public service as a Legislative Aide for Congressman Gary Ackerman (D-NY), and subsequently for New York Council member Arthur Katzman. She then became the full-time Special Assistant and Queens Ombudsman to City Council President Andrew Stein.

From 2002 to 2009, Koslowitz served as Deputy Borough President in the administration of Queens Borough President Helen Marshall. Among her main responsibilities was to oversee Constituent Services and the borough’s 14 Community Boards.

New York City Council
Koslowitz was elected to the New York City Council, representing the 29th district in Queens. The district includes Forest Hills, Rego Park, Maspeth, Kew Gardens, and Richmond Hill. She held this position starting in 1991 when she succeeded Arthur Katzman in a special election.

In 2001, Koslowitz stepped down because of term limits, remaining in government as an appointed Deputy Borough President for Queens. She returned to the City Council in 2009, winning in a five-person Democratic Primary with the backing of the local Democratic Party leadership. She was reelected in 2013 with 91 percent of the vote, defeating an independent candidate.

She has since supported a controversial street redesign that has eliminated 198 parking spaces, stating "We only had one side parking for many, many years". This was in opposition to John Dereszewski, head of Community Board 6's Transportation Committee, who said that while he supports “90 percent of the things that are going to be done,” he couldn't back the proposal because of the loss of nearly 200 parking spaces.

References

External links

New York City Council members
Living people
Politicians from the Bronx
People from Forest Hills, Queens
Women New York City Council members
21st-century American politicians
21st-century American women politicians
James Monroe High School (New York City) alumni
New York (state) Democrats
1941 births